The Seversky Pipe Plant, also known as Severna, was one of the major manufacturing plants located in Polevskoy, Sverdlovsk Oblast of Russia. It is one of the oldest Russian plants at the Urals.

In the early-1730s rich deposits of iron ore were discovered around the Polevskoy village, situated on the river Severushka. In 1734 Vasily Tatishchev chose the site for the plant construction, which began on 1 April 1735. A village grew around the plant, which is now the northern part of the town Polevskoy. All production was branded with the eight-pointed star, which is now present in the Polevskoy's coat of arms. In 1757 the Polevskoy Plant was purchased by the Ural merchant Alexei Turchaninov along with the Polevskoy Copper Smelting Plant.

References 

Buildings and structures in Sverdlovsk Oblast
Manufacturing plants in Russia
1739 establishments in the Russian Empire
Industrial buildings completed in the 18th century